Washington's 36th legislative district is one of forty-nine districts in Washington state for representation in the state legislature. It encompasses part of northwestern Seattle, including the neighborhoods of Ballard, Magnolia, and Queen Anne.

The district's legislators are state senator Noel Frame and state representatives Julia Reed (position 1) and Liz Berry (position 2), all Democrats.

See also
Washington Redistricting Commission
Washington State Legislature
Washington State Senate
Washington House of Representatives

References

External links
Washington State Redistricting Commission
Washington House of Representatives
Map of Legislative Districts

36